Fredric Weigel (born April 23, 1992) is a Swedish professional ice hockey player who currently plays for IF Björklöven in the HockeyAllsvenskan (Allsv). He previously played for the Djurgårdens IF in the then Swedish Elitserien.

References

External links

1992 births
AIK IF players
IF Björklöven players
Djurgårdens IF Hockey players
Living people
Mikkelin Jukurit players
Södertälje SK players
Swedish ice hockey centres
Ice hockey people from Stockholm